Crystal Brook flows into the East Brook by Mundale, New York.

Rivers of New York (state)
Rivers of Delaware County, New York
Tributaries of the West Branch Delaware River